Francis Wharton (Philadelphia, Pennsylvania, March 7, 1820 – February 21, 1889) was an American legal writer and educationalist.

Life
Wharton graduated from Yale in 1839, was admitted to the bar in 1843, became prominent in Pennsylvania politics as a Democrat, and served as assistant attorney-general in 1845. In Philadelphia, he edited the North American and United States Gazette. He was professor of English, History, and Literature at Kenyon College, Gambier, Ohio, from 1856 to 1863.

He took orders in the Protestant Episcopal Church in 1862, and was rector of St. Paul's Church, Brookline, Massachusetts from 1863-1869. In 1871-1881 he taught ecclesiastical polity and canon law in the Protestant Episcopal Theological School at Cambridge, Massachusetts, and at this time he lectured on the conflict of laws at Boston University.

For two years he traveled in Europe, and after two years in Philadelphia he went to Washington, DC, where he was lecturer on criminal law (1885–1886) and then professor of criminal law (1886–1888) at Columbian (now George Washington) University; in 1885-1888 he was solicitor (or examiner of claims) of the Department of State, and from 1888 until his death was employed on an edition (authorized by Congress) of the Revolutionary Diplomatic Correspondence of the United States (6 vols, 1889, ed. by John Bassett Moore), which superseded Jared Sparks's compilation.

Wharton was a "broad churchman" and was deeply interested in the hymnology of his church. Wharton was also interested in Christian apologetics, and he wrote an essay on the relationship between apologetics and jurisprudence that was published in The Princeton Review in 1878.  He received the degree of LL.D. from the University of Edinburgh in 1883, and was the foremost American authority on international law. He authored the doctrine in criminal law (Wharton's Rule of Concert of Action) that to form a conspiracy takes one more person than is necessary to commit the crime (i.e. it takes two people to gamble. Therefore, two people gambling cannot be guilty of conspiracy to gamble, though three can).

During the last two years of his life Wharton amassed revolutionary diplomatic correspondence and edited them into a six volume work, published in 1889, the year of his death.

Publications
A Treatise on the Criminal Law of the United States (1846; many times reprinted)
State Trials of the United States during the Administrations of Washington and Adams (1849)
A Treatise on the Law of Homicide in the United States (1855)
with Moreton Stillé, A Treatise on Medical Jurisprudence (1855)
 A Treatise on Theism and Modern Skeptical Theories (1859), in which he applied rules of legal evidence to modern sceptical theories
A Treatise on the Conflict of Laws (1872; 3rd ed. 1905)
A Treatise on the Law of Negligence (1874)
A Commentary on the Law of Agency and Agents (1876)
A Commentary on the Law of Evidence in Civil Issues (1877; 3rd ed. 1888)
a companion work on Criminal Evidence
 "Recent Changes in Jurisprudence and Christian Apologetics," The Princeton Review, Vol. 2, no. 1 (July–December 1878) pp. 149–168. (This is accessible via http://www.hti.umich.edu/cgi/m/moajrnl).
Commentary on the Law of Contracts (1882)
Commentaries on Law (1884)
Digest of the International Law of the United States (3 vols 1886).

References

 Memoir (Philadelphia, 1891) by his daughter, Mrs. Viele, and several friends.
 J. B. Moore's "Brief Sketch of the Life of Francis Wharton," prefaced to the first volume of the Revolutionary Diplomatic Correspondence.

External links
 
Biography at virtualology.com under his ancestor Thomas Wharton Jr.

1820 births
1889 deaths
American educational theorists
American Episcopal priests
Kenyon College faculty
Members of the Institut de Droit International
Writers from Philadelphia
Wharton family
Yale University alumni
Conflict of laws scholars